Pedro Villarroel C. Airport (is an airstrip  southwest of Combarbalá, a small town in the Coquimbo Region of Chile.

There is mountainous terrain in all quadrants.

See also

Transport in Chile
List of airports in Chile

References

External links
OpenStreetMap - Combarbalá
OurAirports - Pedro Villarroel C. Airport
FallingRain - Pedro Villarroel C. Airport

Airports in Coquimbo Region